The 1944–45 season was the first time since 1940 that Dundee fielded a team, having not played officially throughout the majority of World War II. Dundee would enter the North Eastern Football League, which was split into Autumn and Spring Series. Dundee would impress in their first official competition in years under new manager George Anderson, winning the Autumn series, before coming 5th in the Spring series. Dundee would also compete in the North Eastern League Cup in lieu of the suspended Scottish Cup, and made it to the final before being defeated by Aberdeen.

Autumn series 

Statistics provided by Dee Archive.

Autumn Series table

Spring series 

Statistics provided by Dee Archive.

Spring Series table

North Eastern League Cup 

Statistics provided by Dee Archive.

Player Statistics 
Statistics provided by Dee Archive

|}

See also 

 List of Dundee F.C. seasons

References

External links 

 1944-45 Dundee season on Fitbastats

Dundee F.C. seasons
Dundee